Lessonina is a genus of air-breathing sea slugs, a shell-less marine pulmonate gastropod mollusks in the family Onchidiidae.

Species
Species within the genus Labbella include:
 Lessonina ferruginea (Lesson, 1830)

References

 Dayrat, B. (2009) Review of the current knowledge of the systematics of Onchidiidae (Mollusca: Gastropoda: Pulmonata) with a checklist of nominal species. Zootaxa 2068: 1-26

Onchidiidae